Carlia schmeltzii, known commonly as the robust rainbow-skink, is a species of lizard in the family Scincidae. The species is endemic to Australia.

Etymology
The specific name, schmeltzii, is in honor of German ethnographer Johannes Dietrich Eduard Schmeltz.

Geographic range
C. schmeltzii is native to New South Wales and Queensland in eastern Australia.

Habitat
The preferred natural habitats of C. schmeltzii are rocky areas, shrubland, savanna, and forest.

Reproduction
C. schmeltzii is oviparous.

References

Further reading
Cogger HG (2014). Reptiles and Amphibians of Australia, Seventh Edition. Clayton, Victoria, Australia: CSIRO Publishing. xxx + 1,033 pp. .
Dolman G, Hugall AF (2008). "Combined mitochondrial and nuclear data enhance resolution of rapid radiation of Australian rainbow skinks (Scincidae: Carlia)". Molecular Phylogenetics and Evolution 49 (3): 782–794.
Doody JS, Schembri B (2014). "Carlia schmeltzii (robust rainbow skink) environmentally-cued hatching". Herpetological Review 45 (3): 494.
Peters W (1867). "Herpetologische Notizen ". Monatsberichte der Königlich-Preussischen Akademie der Wissenschaften zu Berlin 1867: 13–37. (Heteropus schmeltzii, new species, p. 23). (in German).
Wilson S, Swan G (2013). A Complete Guide to Reptiles of Australia, Fourth Edition. Sydney: New Holland Publishers. 522 pp. .

Carlia
Reptiles described in 1867
Endemic fauna of Australia
Skinks of Australia
Taxa named by Wilhelm Peters